Clute is a city in Brazoria County, Texas, within the Houston metropolitan area. As of the 2020 U.S. Census, the city population was 10,604. The city gained some fame with the discovery of a fossilized mammoth named Asiel. There is now a restaurant/museum of the same name to honor this discovery.

Geography

Clute is located at  (29.026060, –95.394539).

History

Clute's history began at the junction of the old Calvit and Eagle Island Plantations. Alexander Calvit, one of Stephen F. Austin's Old Three Hundred, obtained title to the land in 1824. Eagle Island Plantation belonged to Jared Groce, the richest man in Austin's Colony. Calvit's plantation later became the Herndon sugar plantation, owned by John H. Herndon, who married Calvit's only daughter.

After the American Civil War, Joseph Pegan, Soloman J. Clute, and several relatives including George and John Clute, founded a community near the plantation site. In 1881, the name Clute was adopted when both plantations were bought by Solomon J. Clute.  George was described as, "a little Yankee from New York with a long, white beard." The other founders of Clute have also been described as northerners. The Clutes acquired additional land from Herndon, who put it up for auction in the 1870s.

A deed dated March 17, 1886, transferred ownership from Soloman Clute to George Clute for property known as Clute's Place. Soloman administered the community until 1888 or 1889, when it was sold. The Eagle Island Plantation of William H. Wharton occupied the site of present Restwood Memorial Park.

In 1933 Clute had only two businesses and a population of ten. By 1937 the town had a school for white children with two teachers and two schools for black children with one teacher each. In the early 1940s, Clute began to prosper with the advent of Dow Chemical and several large construction companies moving into Southern Brazoria County. A post office was established by 1943, and a new grade school was built in the 1950s.

In 1950 Clute had a population of 700 and thirty-six businesses; in 1954 the residents numbered 3,200 and the businesses forty-five. Clute was incorporated in May 1952 under the name Clute City, with a commission form of government; in 1955 the town changed its name back to Clute and adopted an alderman (city council) form of government.

Brazoswood High School opened in Clute in 1969 with grades 9–11. The first class graduated 356 students in May 1971.  Brazoswood won the state championship in football in 1974.

Mammoth discovery
In November 2003, a mammoth was found buried in a sand pit in Clute by a backhoe operator for Vernor Material & Equipment Co. The operator uncovered a pair of tusks in the pit near Brazoswood High School.  This was believed to be remains of the first-dated mammoth discovered on the Texas Gulf Coast.

The mammoth was judged to be about 38,000 years old, judging from the age of logs recovered near the site.  The mammoth was considered to be a Columbian mammoth. These mammoths were slightly larger and less hairy than their famous cousin, the wooly mammoth. In addition, fossil logs and remains of bison, horse, deer and turtle are present, providing a glimpse of a unique Ice Age environment buried 35' below the surface, said Robson Bonnichsen, director of the Center for the Study of the First Americans.

Demographics

As of the 2020 United States census, there were 10,604 people, 4,453 households, and 2,854 families residing in the city.

As of the census of 2000, there were 10,424 people, 3,674 households, and 2,564 families residing in the city. The population density was 1,949.1 people per square mile (752.3/km2). There were 4,142 housing units at an average density of 774.5 per square mile (298.9/km2). The racial makeup of the city was 64.22% White, 7.66% African American, 0.76% Native American, 0.96% Asian, 0.01% Pacific Islander, 23.03% from other races, and 3.37% from two or more races. Hispanic or Latino of any race were 48.09% of the population.

There were 3,674 households, out of which 41.0% had children under the age of 18 living with them, 49.3% were married couples living together, 14.5% had a female householder with no husband present, and 30.2% were non-families. 24.0% of all households were made up of individuals, and 4.7% had someone living alone who was 65 years of age or older. The average household size was 2.79 and the average family size was 3.35.

In the city, the population was spread out, with 31.4% under the age of 18, 13.5% from 18 to 24, 31.1% from 25 to 44, 16.4% from 45 to 64, and 7.6% who were 65 years of age or older. The median age was 28 years. For every 100 females, there were 101.7 males. For every 100 females age 18 and over, there were 99.7 males.

The median income for a household in the city was $32,622, and the median income for a family was $34,638. Males had a median income of $31,574 versus $18,396 for females. The per capita income for the city was $14,008. About 16.0% of families and 18.2% of the population were below the poverty line, including 22.0% of those under age 18 and 14.5% of those age 65 or over.

Education 
The public schools in the city are operated by the Brazosport Independent School District. Schools in Clute include:
 Madge Griffith Elementary School
 T. W. Ogg Elementary School
 Clute Intermediate School
 Brazoswood High School

The city is also served by Brazosport College. The Texas Legislature designated the Brazosport ISD as in the Brazosport College zone.

The Clute Library is a part of the Brazoria County Library System.

Culture
Clute hosts "The Great Texas Mosquito Festival" every July. The festival has been held annually since 1981.  The three-day festival attracts some 18,000 visitors.

Notable people

 Ron Paul, Clute is where former Rep. Ron Paul currently resides, and is also where his son, Sen. Rand Paul went to high school

References

External links
 City of Clute
 Brazosport Center for the Arts & Sciences Website

Cities in Brazoria County, Texas
Cities in Texas
Greater Houston